History of the Soul, written by Zhang Chengzhi, is a work of narrative history spanning 172 years, which explores the personal and religious conflicts among the Jahriyya, a Sufi tariqah in Northwestern China. Published in 1991, it went on to become China's second-best selling book in 1994.

Plot summary
The book is divided into seven chapters or "gates", each corresponding to one of the seven generations of the masters, martyrs, and common people of the Jahriyya Order. 
 Chapter 1: The Scarlet Green Banner (红色绿旗)
 Chapter 2: The True Vanishing (真实的隐没)
 Chapter 3: Exile (流放)
 Chapter 4: A New World (新世界)
 Chapter 5: The Beauty of Martyrdom (牺牲之美)
 Chapter 6: Disgraced (被侮辱的)
 Chapter 7: Knocking on Modernity's Gate (叩开现代的大门)

Editions 
 First edition: 心灵史, People's Republic of China: Huacheng Publishing House, January 1991.
 1995 edition: 张承志文学作品选集:心灵史卷, People's Republic of China: Hainan Publishing House, August 1995. .
 Traditional Chinese edition: 心靈史──揭開哲合忍耶的聖域之謎, Republic of China (Taiwan): Fengyun Shidai, January 1997. .
 1999 edition: 张承志著.心灵史 长篇小说卷[M].长沙：湖南文艺出版社.1999. .

References

Notes

Sources
 

 

Zhang, Chengzhi. Xin Ling Shi. Guangzhou Shi: Hua cheng chu ban she, 1991. Print.

1991 non-fiction books
Chinese literature
Religion in China